The Cyrus-class sixth rates of the Royal Navy were a series of sixteen-flush decked sloops of war built to an 1812 design by Sir William Rule, the Surveyor of the Navy. The first nine ships of the class were launched in 1813 and the remaining seven in 1814. The vessels of the class served at the end of the Napoleonic War.

The Cyrus class was intended to be the counter to the new Frolic-class ship-rigged sloops that were under construction for the United States Navy. No encounter took place between any vessel of the Frolic class and one of the Cyrus class, but HMS Levant was captured by the older American frigate .

With the re-organisation of the rating system which took place in the Royal Navy effective from 1 January 1817, the Cyrus-class flush-decked ships were re-classified as 20-gun sloops.

Ships in class

Notes

References

 Rif Winfield, British Warships in the Age of Sail, 1793-1817, Chatham Publishing, London 2005.

 
Ship classes